Árstíðir (English: Seasons) is an Icelandic classically influenced indie-folk rock/chamber pop band. The defining characteristic of this band is their vocal harmonies, as all members sing.

The band formed in 2008 in Reykjavík as a trio, consisting of Daniel Auðunsson (guitar), Gunnar Már Jakobsson (guitar) and Ragnar Ólafsson (baritone guitar). When they recorded their first album, Árstíðir, Jónas Jensson (cello) and Jón Elísson (piano) joined the band. In 2010, the band became a sextet with Karl James Pestka (violin). Jón Elísson and Hallgrímur Jónas Jensson left Árstíðir in late 2013, and Karl James Pestka in 2016.

Currently, Árstíðir is composed of members Gunnar Már Jakobsson (baritone guitar), Daniel Auðunsson (guitar) and Ragnar Ólafsson (piano). Since founding the band, they have released three albums: one live EP and two studio albums. Árstíðir have always been an independent band. In Iceland, they have their own record company, Nivalis, and in Germany they have a cooperation contract with Beste Unterhaltung. In 2014, they crowdfunded their third studio album, Hvel, via Kickstarter, which was released in March 2015.

Discography

Studio 
 2009: Árstíðir (English: Seasons)
 2011: Svefns og vöku skil (English: Sleep State Return)
 2015: Hvel (English: Spheres)
 2016: Verloren Verleden (English: Lost Past) in collaboration with Anneke van Giersbergen
 2018: Nivalis (English: Snow)
 2021: Pendúll (English: Pendulum)
 2022: Blik (English: Look)

Lives & EPs 
 2009: Live at Fríkirkjan (Free Church) (EP)
 2012: Tvíeind (Remix EP)

Viral Video 
Árstíðir became known to a wider internet audience in 2013 when a YouTube video of an impromptu a capella performance of Heyr himna smiður, (English: Hear, Smith of Heavens), a 13th-century Icelandic hymn, at Vohwinkel train station in Wuppertal, Germany went viral after a performance there. The video was shot by their PR manager.

Awards and nominations 

|-
|2009 ||  Album "Árstíðir" || #1 in Iceland Album Chart|| 
|-
|2012 ||  Folkherbst in Plauen, Germany ||Eiserner Eversteiner, Jury Award || 
|-

References

External links 
 
 Details 

Icelandic indie rock groups
Musical groups from Reykjavík